Regenstauf is a municipality in the district of Regensburg, in Bavaria, Germany. It is situated on the river Regen, 12 km north of Regensburg.

Points of interest
Eichmühle

Economy
The WIMEX Group, an internationally active German concern in the meat and agricultural industry, was founded in and has its headquarters in Regenstauf.

References

Regensburg (district)